The Wauseon Exempted Village School District is the public school system in Wauseon, Ohio, United States. There are four schools and three buildings in the district (Wauseon Elementary and Middle Schools share one building):

Wauseon Primary (Formally Legget Street Primary School) - Grades Kindergarten to 2nd Grade. The principal is Blake Young.
Wauseon Elementary School (Formally Elm Street Elementary School) - Grades 3rd to 5th. The principal is Theresa Vietmeier.
Wauseon Middle School (Formally Burr Road Middle School) - Grades 6th to 8th. The principal is Joe Friess.
Wauseon High School - Grades 9th to 12th. The principal is Keith Leatherman.

References

External links
 

Education in Fulton County, Ohio
School districts in Ohio